Basal cell carcinoma, susceptibility to, 6 is a protein that in humans is encoded by the BCC6 gene.

References